Austin Osueke is an American comic book artist, publisher, and founder of the companies eigoMANGA and Comic Distro. He is best known for contributing to Amerimanga and web comics through his publications Sakura Pakk and Rumble Pak.

Bibliography

eigoMANGA Productions

Notes

References

External links
eigoMANGA Website
Rumble Pak Website
Sakura Pakk Website

Living people
American comics artists
Year of birth missing (living people)